Usambaromyia nigrala is a species of African non-biting midges, and is the only species in the subfamily Usambaromyiinae.

References

External links

Chironomidae
Diptera of Africa
Culicomorpha genera
Monotypic Diptera genera